The Capitoline Museums (Italian: Musei Capitolini) are a group of art and archaeological museums in Piazza del Campidoglio, on top of the Capitoline Hill in Rome, Italy. The historic seats of the museums are Palazzo dei Conservatori and Palazzo Nuovo, facing on the central trapezoidal piazza in a plan conceived by Michelangelo in 1536 and executed over a period of more than 400 years. 

The history of the museum can be traced to 1471, when Pope Sixtus IV donated a collection of important ancient bronzes to the people of Rome and located them on the Capitoline Hill. Since then, the museums' collection has grown to include many ancient Roman statues, inscriptions, and other artifacts; a collection of medieval and Renaissance art; and collections of jewels, coins, and other items. The museums are owned and operated by the municipality of Rome.

The statue of a mounted rider in the centre of the piazza is of Emperor Marcus Aurelius. It is a copy, the original being housed on-site in the Capitoline museum.

Opened to the public in 1734 under Clement XII, the Capitoline Museums are considered one of the oldest museums in the world, understood as a place where art could be enjoyed by all and not only by the owners.

Buildings

This section contains collections sorted by building, and brief information on the buildings themselves.  For the history of their design and construction, see Capitoline Hill#Michelangelo.

The Capitoline Museums are composed of three main buildings surrounding the Piazza del Campidoglio and interlinked by an underground gallery beneath the piazza.

The three main buildings of the Capitoline Museums are:

Palazzo Senatorio, built in the 12th century and modified according to Michelangelo's designs;
Palazzo dei Conservatori, built in the mid-16th century and redesigned by Michelangelo with the first use of the giant order column design; and
Palazzo Nuovo, built in the 17th century with an identical exterior design to the Palazzo dei Conservatori, which it faces across the palazzo.

In addition, the 16th century Palazzo Caffarelli-Clementino, located off the piazza adjacent to the Palazzo dei Conservatori, was added to the museum complex in the early 20th century.

Palazzo dei Conservatori
The collections here are ancient sculpture, mostly Roman but also Greek and Egyptian.

Main staircase
Features the relief from the honorary monument to Marcus Aurelius.

2nd floor
The second floor of the building is occupied by the Conservator's Apartment, a space now open to the public and housing such famous works as the bronze she-wolf nursing Romulus and Remus, which has become the emblem of Rome. The Conservator's Apartment is distinguished by elaborate interior decorations, including frescoes, stuccos, tapestries, and carved ceilings and doors.

3rd floor
The third floor of the Palazzo dei Conservatori houses the Capitoline Art Gallery, housing the museums' painting and applied art galleries. The Capitoline Coin Cabinet, containing collections of coins, medals, jewels, and jewelry, is located in the attached Palazzo Caffarelli-Clementino.

Palazzo Nuovo

Statues, inscriptions, sarcophagi, busts, mosaics, and other ancient Roman artifacts occupy two floors of the Palazzo Nuovo.

In the Hall of the Galatian can also be appreciated the marble statue of the "Dying Gaul" also called “Capitoline Gaul” and the statue of Cupid and Psyche. Also housed in this building are:
The colossal statue restored as Oceanus, located in the museum courtyard of this building
A fragment of the Tabula Iliaca located at the Hall of the Doves
The statue of Capitoline Venus, from an original by Praxiteles (4th century BC)

Galleria di Congiunzione
The Galleria di Congiunzione is located beneath the Palazzo dei Conservatori and the piazza itself, and links the three palazzos sitting on the piazza. The gallery was constructed in the 1930s. It contains in situ 2nd century ruins of ancient Roman dwellings, and also houses the Galleria Lapidaria, which displays the Museums' collection of epigraphs.

New wing
The new great glass covered hall — the Sala Marco Aurelio — created by covering the Giardino Romano is similar to the one used for the Sala Ottagonale and British Museum Great Court. The 1996 design is by the architect Carlo Aymonino. Its volume recalls that of the oval space designed by Michelangelo for the piazza.

Its centerpiece is the bronze equestrian statue of Marcus Aurelius, which was once in the centre of Piazza del Campidoglio and has been kept indoors ever since its modern restoration. Moving these statues out of the palazzo allows those sculptures temporarily moved to the Centrale Montemartini to be brought back. It also houses the remaining fragments of the bronze colossus of Constantine and the archaeological remains of the tuff foundations of the temple of Capitoline Jupiter, with a model, drawn and computer reconstructions and finds dating from the earliest occupation on the site (in the mid Bronze Age: 17th-14th centuries B.C.) to the foundation of the temple (6th century BC).

In the three halls adjacent to the Appartamento dei Conservatori are to be found the showcases of the famous Castellani Collection with a part of the set of Greek and Etruscan vases that was donated to the municipality of Rome by Augusto Castellani in the mid-19th century.

Centrale Montemartini

The Centrale Montemartini is a former power station of Acea (active as a power-station between the 1890s and 1930s) in southern Rome, between Piramide and the basilica of San Paolo Fuori le Mura, close to the Metro station Garbatella. 

In 1997, the Centrale Montemartini was adapted to temporarily accommodate a part of the antique sculpture collection of the Capitoline museums, at that time closed for renovation; the temporary exhibition was so appreciated that the venue was eventually converted into a permanent museum.

Its permanent collection comprises 400 ancient statues, moved here during the reorganisation of the Capitoline Museums in 1997, along with tombs, busts, and mosaics. Many of them were excavated in the ancient Roman horti (e.g. the Gardens of Sallust) between the 1890s and 1930s, a fruitful period for Roman archaeology.  They are displayed there along the lines of Tate Modern, except that (unlike there) the machinery has not been moved out.

Gallery

See also
 Capitoline Brutus

References

External links
 Capitoline Museums official website (English language version). Retrieved April 26, 2010.
 Capitoline Museums research website (English/German/Italian language versions).
 
Virtual tour of the Capitoline Museums provided by Google Arts & Culture

 
Art museums and galleries in Rome
Piazzas in Rome
Archaeological museums in Italy
Museum districts
1471 establishments in Europe
15th century in the Papal States
Michelangelo buildings
Museums of ancient Rome in Italy
Museums of ancient Greece in Italy
Numismatic museums in Italy
Museums established in 1471
Articles containing video clips
Rome R. X Campitelli
Rome Q. X Ostiense
Capitoline Hill